Tafadzwa is a Zimbabwean given name that may refer to

Tafadzwa Sangare (born 2003), Zimbabwean dripper
Tafadzwa Chitokwindo (born 1990), Zimbabwean rugby player 
Tafadzwa Dube (born 1984), Zimbabwean football goalkeeper 
Tafadzwa Kamungozi (born 1987), Zimbabwean cricketer 
Tafadzwa Madondo (1981–2008), Zimbabwean cricketer
Tafadzwa Manyimo (born 1977), Zimbabwean cricketer
Tafadzwa Mpofu (born 1985), Zimbabwean cricketer
Tafadzwa Mufambisi (born 1986), Zimbabwean cricketer 
Tafadzwa Rusike (born 1989), Zimbabwean football player 
Tafadzwa Tsiga (born 1994), Zimbabwean cricketer
Tafadzwa Chando (born 1997), Zimbabwean Youth and Climate Activist